Camarotella costaricensis is a plant pathogen.

References

External links

Fungal plant pathogens and diseases
Phyllachorales